Ray Mentzer (August 3, 1953 – June 12, 2001) born in Philadelphia was the 1976 Junior Mr. America, 1978 IFBB Mr. USA and was winner of the 1979 AAU Mr. America competition. Ray's brother, Mike Mentzer won the rival IFBB Mr. America in 1976 during Ray's Junior title.

He was a proponent of heavy duty training along with Mike and although retiring from competition in 1982, carried on training to the heavy duty high intensity principles. In 1983, he flew to Florida in order to be trained by Arthur Jones. At a bodyweight of a then unthinkable 250 plus pounds, he added even more muscle within a month, to 260 but leaner. At one time, training for just six weeks to prove the invalidity of the Bulgarian system, he squatted 902 pounds for 2 repetitions.

He died from kidney failure, a complication resulting from Berger's disease in Rolling Hills, California. Ray died just two days after discovering his brother Mike Mentzer's body in the same apartment due to heart failure.

References

External links 

 Hause, Irene [L.].  (1983, January).  Mike Mentzer’s Video Venture.  Muscle Mag International.  Issue Number 33, pages 22–25.  Ray Mentzer is quoted in this article.  (Retrieved November 16, 2008.)

American bodybuilders
1953 births
2001 deaths
Professional bodybuilders